Vijay Nagar is a major residential, industrial and commercial area in Ghaziabad, Uttar Pradesh, India. It was developed with assistance of the Ghaziabad Development Authority. The suburb is located at the junction of Noida, Greater Noida, Crossings Republik, Pratap Vihar and Indirapuram. Vijay Nagar is known for its educational institutes, industrial areas, the Ghaziabad Junction Railway Station, the Meerut Expressway, NH-24 and the Vishwakarma Road. The area has witnessed rampant growth in infrastructure and civic development. Vijay Nagar is closely linked with the adjoining Pratap Vihar area having a residential area, upcoming real estate projects and the Santosh Medical & Dental College, a part of Santosh University.The adjoining Bhur Bharat Nagar is close to Ghaziabad Railway Station, the nearest railway station that serves this area.

The residential and commercial areas are divided into two regions: Old Vijay Nagar and New Vijay Nagar. Other localities are divided into a number of sectors and blocks. The more prominent ones include Sector-9 which has several blocks ranging from A to K and Sector-12. Other districts include Shivpuri, Ambedkar Nagar, Sarvodaya Nagar, Maya Puri, UPSIDC industrial area and Ispat Nagar. The area is spread across NH-24 and the upcoming 19 km-long Delhi–Meerut Expressway between UP Gate and Dasna which is scheduled to be completed by 2020. The project is facing delays. An 8 km stretch of Delhi-Meerut Expressway from UP Gate to Vijay Nagar will open to traffic in March 2019

Education
 JKG International School
 M.P. Public School
 Children's Academy
 Rose Bell Public School
 RK Memorial Junior High School
 Bloom Public Senior Secondary School
 DAV Public School
 Gautam Public School
 New Era Public Academy
 New Rainbow Public School
 East Delhi Public School
 Indirapuram Public School
 B.R. Public School

Healthcare
Notable healthcare centre's in the area include Kothari Hospitals, Rani Ghai Clinic, Bharti Dental Clinic and Tyagi Nursing Home, Tripathi Hospital and Trauma centre, Jeevan Jyoti Hospital, Aastha Hospital, Pt.Sunderlal Sharma Multispeciality Hospital, Khatri Nursing Home.

Religion
The area has several temples, mosques and other religious places.

 Shiv Mandir in Sector-9, New Vijay Nagar
 Shiv Mandir in Old Vijay Nagar
 Gurudwara near Ghaziabad Railway Station
 Sheetla Mata Mandir in Shivpuri.
 Madina Masjid in Mawai sector 9 vijay nagar.
 Shree Sanatan Dharm Mandir in Bhoor Bharat Nagar.
 Shani Mandir in sector 9 vijay nagar.

Banks
Prominent Banks are Bank of Baroda, State Bank of India and ATMs in the area are: HDFC, Axis Bank, DCB Bank, ICICI, Punjab National Bank

Markets
Prominent markets, shops and exclusive retail outlets in the area include 1-India Family Mart, Domino's, TVS Motor Company, Hero MotoCorp, More Mall.

Landmarks 
Some important landmarks in the area are: Samraat Chowk, Rani Ghai Clinic, Overhead Water Tank, Chanakya Chowk, Vijay Nagar Police Station, Mawai, Ghaziabad Railway Station, Rathi Mill in Ispat Nagar and UPSIDC Industrial Area.

Developments
 The new railroad bridge in Ghaziabad's Dhobi Ghat is set to be finished by 2018.
 The crore drinking water supply project for six wards of Vijay Nagar.
 The Ghaziabad Municipal Corporation recently signed off on door-to-door collection vehicles for the daily solid waste collection from the 13 residential wards in the city.
 The Delhi-Meerut Expressway work was affected by the ban on construction work by Supreme Court order, even though NHAI was fined Rs. 26 lakh for continuation of work at few sites

Getting there

Local E-Rickshaw, Sharing Auto and Taxi: Locals prefer the usage of the auto rickshaw, that runs on sharing basis. You can also book an exclusive ride either from the NH-24 highway (opposite 1-India Family Mart) or near the Vijay Nagar Police Station or "Thana" or directly from the Vijay Nagar side of the Ghaziabad Junction Railway Station to any of the nearby or Delhi NCR locations in Noida, Greater Noida, Indirapuram, Crossings Republik etc.

Local Train or EMU
You can easily reach the area by an Electric multiple unit (EMU) which is a very popular train configuration for sub-urban travel. Similar to EMU services in Mumbai (popularly called Local), Delhi - Ghaziabad EMU is a popular feeder train to the main line trains that stop at all the prominent stations in Delhi including; New Delhi Railway Station, Delhi Junction Railway Station, Hazrat Nizamuddin Railway Station, Sadar Bazar Railway Station and Anand Vihar Terminal Railway Station.

Upcoming Metro Station
The proposed expansion of metro expansion in Ghaziabad has included Vijay Nagar along NH-24.

References

Neighbourhoods in Ghaziabad, Uttar Pradesh